Ernst Bader (7 June 1914 in Stettin, Pomerania – 10 August 1999 in Norderstedt) was a German actor, composer and songwriter (lyricist) best known for his hit recordings "Tulips from Amsterdam" and "Milord". Actors who have performed songs written or produced by Ernst Bader include Marlene Dietrich, Edith Piaf, Dalida, Charles Aznavour, Nana Mouskouri, Charles Aznavour and Freddy Quinn.

Selected filmography
 Shoulder Arms (1939)
 Legion Condor (1939)

sources/literature
Publishing house: (Ger) Verlag Atelier im Bauernhaus, Fischerhude (1984) "Die Welt ist schön, Milord"

External links
 
 http://swisscharts.com/showperson.asp?name=Ernst+Bader

1914 births
1999 deaths
Actors from Szczecin
German lyricists
German male film actors
People from the Province of Pomerania
20th-century German male actors
German male writers
20th-century German musicians
Writers from Szczecin